Gulpen-Wittem is a municipality in the southeastern Netherlands (in the province of Limburg) with  inhabitants as of .

Gulpen-Wittem came into being after the merger of the municipalities Gulpen and Wittem. This took place after a request of both municipalities. At the time of the merger, both municipalities had about 8000 inhabitants, although Wittem was bigger than Gulpen. The town hall was situated in Gulpen, and has kept its function as town hall in the new municipality. The former town hall of Wittem was situated in a manor house in Mechelen since 1986, which is now being used as a "nursing hostel".

The municipality is rural, with many castles, half-timbered houses and old monumental farms. Yearly, Gulpen-Wittem attracts many tourists from the entire country because of its relatively sloping landscape, especially during the summer.

Population centres

Topography

Dutch Topographic map of the municipality of Gulpen-Wittem, June 2015

Economy
Apart from beer brewing ("Gulpener" (at Gulpen) and "Brand" (at Wijlre)), vinegar production ("Gulpener") and agriculture, tourism is essential aspect of economical activity in this municipality. Especially Slenaken is a distinct tourist site.

Notable people 

 Jan Gerard Kemmerling (1776 in Gulpen – 1818) Mayor of Heerlen and Nieuwenhagen
 Adolphe Engers (1884 in Gulpen – 1945) a Dutch writer and stage and film actor
 Martinus Cobbenhagen (1893 in Gulpen - 1954) a Dutch Roman Catholic priest, economist and academic
 Antoon Coolen (1897 in Wijlre - 1961) a Dutch writer of novels
 René van der Linden (born 1943 in Eys) a retired Dutch politician, diplomat and economist
 Sjef Hensgens (born 1948 in Wijlre) a retired Dutch middle-distance runner, competed at the 1972 Summer Olympics
 Henk Savelberg (born 1953 in Mechelen) a Dutch head chef
 Ralf Vandebergh (born 1976 in Nijswiller) a Dutch astronomer and professional photographer

Gallery

References

External links

Official website

 
South Limburg (Netherlands)
Municipalities of Limburg (Netherlands)
Municipalities of the Netherlands established in 1999